Listed below are the UCI Women's Teams that competed in the 2008 women's road cycling events organized by the International Cycling Union (UCI) including the 2008 UCI Women's Road World Cup.

Teams overview

Riders

AA-Drink Cycling Team

 Marlijn Binnendijk (The Netherlands) 12-05-1986  
 Chantal Blaak (The Netherlands) 22-10-1989  
 Latoya Brulee (Belgium) 09-12-1988  
 Paulina Brzeźna-Bentkowska (Poland) 10-09-1981  
 Maxime Groenewegen (The Netherlands) 14-07-1988  
 Ludivine Henrion (Belgium) 23-01-1984  
 Emma Johansson (Sweden) 23-09-1983  
 Gabrielle Rovers (The Netherlands) 21-11-1976  
 Theresa Senff (Germany) 02-02-1982  
 Inge van den Broeck (Belgium) 21-03-1978 
 Irene van den Broek (The Netherlands) 26-08-1980 
 Laure Werner (Belgium) 22-02-1981  
 Kirsten Wild (The Netherlands) 15-10-1982
Source:

Cycling Team Titanedi-Frezza Acca Due O

Ages as of 1 January 2008.

Elk Haus

Ages as of 1 January 2008.

POL–Aqua

Ages as of 1 January 2008.

Primus

Ages as of 1 January 2008.

Team Flexpoint

  Elisabeth Braam
  Saskia Elemans
  Loes Gunnewijk
  Britt Jochems
  Jacobien Kanis
  Bianca Knöpfle
  Susanne Ljungskog
  Loes Markerink
  Mirjam Melchers
  Amber Neben
  Trine Schmidt
  Iris Slappendel
  Adriene Snijder
  Anita Valen
  Suzanne van Veen
  Elise van Hage
Source:

Team Halfords Bikehut

Ages as of 1 January 2008.

Team Lot-et-Garonne

Ages as of 1 January 2008.

Team Specialized Designs For Women

Ages as of 1 January 2008.

USC Chirio Forno D'asolo

Verducci Breakaway Racing

Ages as of 1 January 2008.

Vrienden van het Platteland

Ages as of 1 January 2008. 

Sources

Guest riders
The team had Felicia Gomez and Linn Torp as guest riders during the Tour of New Zealand and Gomez also during the Geelong Tour.

Webcor Builders Cycling Team

Ages as of 1 January 2008.

References

2008 in women's road cycling
2008